The Gold Coast Art Festival was created in 2010 by sculptor Frederic Berjot. It takes place every year in March at the Southport Broadwater Parklands with the support of the Gold Coast City Council and Southport Broadwater Parklands. The one-month-long festival is attended by thousands of local and international visitors and engage 90 artists all together.

Since 2013, the Gold Coast art focuses on opening nonprofit, artist-run initiatives called Urban Paradise Galleryon the Gold Coast and Brisbane.

The new GCAF gallery is now located in Woolloongabba.

External links
 Official website
 Frederic Berjot's website
 Urban Paradise Gallery

Arts festivals in Australia
Festivals in Queensland
Culture of Gold Coast, Queensland